Annika Beck was the defending champion in the 2013 Reinert Open, having won the event in 2012, but she chose not to defend her title in Versmold.

Dinah Pfizenmaier won the title, defeating Maryna Zanevska in the final, 6–4, 4–6, 6–4.

Seeds

Main draw

Finals

Top half

Bottom half

References 
 Main draw

Reinert Open - Singles
Reinert Open